Nandaprayag is a town and a nagar panchayat in Chamoli district in the Indian state of Uttarakhand. Nandaprayag is one of the Panch Prayag (five confluences) of Alaknanda River and lies at the confluence of the Alaknanda River and Nandakini River. Nandaprayag was once the capital of the Yadu kingdom.

Geography
It has an average elevation of 1,358 metres (4,455 feet). The 538 km long NH 58, connecting NCR with the holy shrine Badrinath and the Mana pass near Indo-Tibet border, pass through this quaint town. The town is nestled in the mountainous terrain overlooking the confluence or holy "Prayag".

Demographics
 India census, Nandaprayag had a population of 1433. Males constitute 56% of the population and females 44%. Nandaprayag has an average literacy rate of 70%, higher than the national average of 59.5%: male literacy is 78%, and female literacy is 61%. In Nandaprayag, 13% of the population is under 6 years of age.

Hydro Electric Project
Uttarakhand Jalvidyut UJVN, a government of Uttarakhand enterprise, is working on the Bowala Nand Prayag Hydro Electric Power Project. The project with a proposed installation of 300 MW (4 x 75 MW) is envisaged to generate an annual energy generation of 1102 MU in a 90% dependable year.

Salient Features

 Location - Chamoli district, Uttarakhand
 River – Alaknanda
 Capacity - 300 MW
 Barrage - 5 Nos. of gates of size 11.0 x 8.0 m
 Head Race Tunnel - 10.05 Km, 9.3 m dia Horse Shoe
 Surge shaft - 27 m dia underground restricted orifice of 80.0 m height
 Penstock - 4 Nos., 3.0 m dia, each
 Surface Power House - size 120m long x 22.2 m wide x 44 m high
 Generator 4 units of 75 MW each
 Francis Turbine - 4 Nos. of Vertical
 Rated head - 138.9 m
 Project land – 62.0 Ha
 Annual Generation - 1343.1 MU
 Project Cost - 2226.56 crores on Feb, 2015 PL
 Year of Commissioning/Completion Schedule - Dec 2022

Gallery

References

External links
 Chamoli district, Official website

Cities and towns in Chamoli district